Joseph Graham may refer to:

 Joe Graham, Irish writer and historian
 Joseph Graham (North Carolina soldier) (1759-1836), American Revolutionary War militia officer, politician, and wealthy ironmonger from North Carolina
 Joseph Graham (footballer) (1889–1968), English footballer